Polling im Innkreis is a municipality in the district of Braunau am Inn in the Austrian state of Upper Austria.

Geography
Polling lies in the Innviertel. About 10 percent of the municipality is forest and 86 percent farmland.

References

Cities and towns in Braunau am Inn District